Curt Querner (1904–1976) was a German painter.

Biography
Querner was born in Börnchen, a village in Saxony not far south of Dresden (later incorporated into Possendorf, which today is part of Bannewitz). The son of a shoemaker, he trained in metalworking and worked for a time as a factory mechanic (Fabrikschlosser).

From 1926 to 1930 Querner studied at the Dresden Academy of Fine Arts. He exhibited for the first time at the Galerie Junge Kunst, of  Józef Sandel, in Dresden.

References

1904 births
1976 deaths
20th-century German painters
20th-century German male artists
German male painters